"Ahora Me Llama" is a song by Colombian singer Karol G and Puerto Rican rapper Bad Bunny, released on May 26, 2017.

Music video
The video of "Ahora Me Llama" was released on June 8, 2017 on Karol G's YouTube channel. As of March 2022, the music video for the song has over 932 million views on YouTube.

Charts

Weekly charts

Year-end charts

Certifications

References

2018 singles
2018 songs
Karol G songs
Bad Bunny songs
Spanish-language songs
Songs written by Bad Bunny